Punta Santa Teresa Lighthouse is an active lighthouse located
at the east side, opposite to the outer breakwater of the gulf of La Spezia, in the municipality of Lerici, Liguria on the Ligurian Sea.

Description
The lighthouse is powered by a solar unit and is completely automated and operated by the Marina Militare with the identification code number 1745 E.F.

See also
 List of lighthouses in Italy

References

External links
 Servizio Fari Marina Militare

Lighthouses in Italy